Dan O'Rourke (born August 31, 1972) is a Canadian NHL referee who wears uniform number nine.

Career 
O'Rourke was one of the selected referees who officiated during the 2007 Stanley Cup Playoffs. He was also selected to officiate in the 2011 Stanley Cup Finals alongside Stephen Walkom, Dan O'Halloran and Kelly Sutherland.l  O'Rourke also officiated the 2020 Stanley Cup Finals in Edmonton, Alberta, inside the NHL "bubble".

He played most notably in the ECHL with the now-defunct Louisiana IceGators and Erie Panthers as a forward.

Career statistics

References

External links

1972 births
Detroit Vipers players
Erie Panthers players
Houston Aeros (1994–2013) players
Living people
Louisiana IceGators (ECHL) players
Moose Jaw Warriors players
National Hockey League officials
Ice hockey people from Calgary
Tri-City Americans players
Tulsa Oilers (1992–present) players
Oakland Skates players
Phoenix Cobras players
Canadian expatriate ice hockey players in the United States
Canadian ice hockey left wingers